Nova Olinda is a municipality of the Northeastern state of Ceará in Brazil. It is located in the micro-region of Cariri, mesoregion of Southern Cearense, Metropolitan Region of Cariri. Its population is 15,798 inhabitants, as estimated by the IBGE in 2021.[2] It was created in 1957 and its area is 284,404 km².

History 
Originally it was called Tapera, but due to its geographical aspect a Pernambuco missionary changed the toponym to Nova Olinda. Belonging to the municipality of Santana do Cariri the village then became a district by virtue of the decree n° 1256, on December 4, 1933. Nova Olinda was elevated to municipality by law n° 3,555, on March 14, 1957 and installed on April 26 of the same year. District created with the name Nova Olinda ex-village, by decree nº 1256, of 04-121933, subordinated to the municipality of Santana do Cariri. In administrative division referring to the year 1933, the district of Nova Olinda appears in the municipality of Santana do Cariri.
Thus remaining in territorial divisions dated 31-XII-1936 and 31-XII-1937.
By state decree-law nº 448, of 12-20-1938, the municipality of Santana do Cariri changed its name to Santanópole. In territorial division dated 1-VII-1950, the district of Nova Olinda, appears in the municipality of Santanópole ex-Santana do Cariri.
By state law nº 1153, of 11-22-1953, the municipality of Santanópole is renamed Santana do Cariri. In territorial division dated 1-VII-1955, the district of Nova Olinda, appears in the municipality of Santanópole ex-Santana do Cariri. Elevated to the category of municipality with the name of Nova Olinda, by state law nº 3555, of 03-14-1957, dismembered from Santana do Cariri. Headquarters in the old district of Nova Olinda. Made up of the headquarters district. Installed on 14-06-1957. In territorial division dated 1-VII-1960, the municipality is made up of the district headquarters. So staying in the territorial division dated 2005.

Distinguish People 
Emerson Ceará: He is an important figure for the city. He is a comedian and has a YouTube channel where he posts his videos that have many views.

Geography

Climate 
Tropical Hot Sub-humid, tropical Hot Semi-arid Mild, tropical Hot Semi-arid. Average temperature of 24 to 26° celsius. The rainy season occurs between January and May.

Vegetation 
Thorny Deciduous Forest, Tropical Rainfall Evergreen Forest, Rainfall-Nebular Tropical Evergreen Forest, and Xeromorphic Tropical Evergreen Forest.

Tourism 
Nova Olinda offers visitors good options: archeology, folklore, handicraft and nature. It also preserves the Church of the patron Saint of Sebastião, an example of the beautiful architecture of its buildings. 

It is one the 65 cities inducing national tourism by the Ministry of Tourism, being one of the four cities located on Ceará:
 Aracati
 Fortaleza
 Jijoca de Jericoacoara
 Nova Olinda

Main Tourist Attractions 
 Casa Grande Fundation: Casa Grande is a project designed to exercise youth protagonism. Many children are involved in this cultural project that preserves much of Cariri's culture, passing on all the knowledge they have acquired. There is a collection of DVDs, comics and many other important artifacts for the region. The site also has a theater and a restaurant. 
 Violeta Arraes Theater: The theater opened on November 19, 2002 and was a gift for children in the community to have access to culture and education. The theater takes its name in honor of the sertanejo Violeta Arraes and the architectural ensemble of the sugarcane mills in the Cariri region. The theater is a popular tourist spot in the region, sought after by hundreds of people and enchants with its construction and ancient stories.
 Museum Ciclo do Couro: In this museum you will find the entire history of Espedito Seleiro and its memory, creations and art. It is a place of great cultural wealth that presents all the aesthetics of the sertanejo man.
 Ponte de Pedra: Geosite Ponte de Pedra is located in Sítio Olho D'água de Santa Bárbara is a remarkable site in the landscape, with a beautiful panoramic view, located in the municipality of Nova Olinda, on the descent of Chapada do Araripe. It is represented by a natural rock formation that resembles a bridge, as it covers the gap of a stream that only has water in times of rain. It delimits an area between the Chapada de Araripe, with its abundant forest and the culture of collecting pequi, and the Sertão, which can be seen on the way down. The bridge probably served as a trail for the ancient populations, both for the Indians and for the former cowboys who colonized the region. Near the bridge, there are archaeological remains of prehistoric populations. There are engravings and cave paintings, as well as occasional finds of ceramic remains and lithic material used by the ancient Kariri inhabitants. It is one of the places where the geological and natural past can be studied together with human history.

Education 
The municipality has a considerable rate of schooling, the number of approval (97,60 %) according to the latest research exceeds the levels of failure (1,81 %) and abandonment (0,59 %). The number of teachers with higher education is considerable, which directly impacts the educational levels of the municipality. The number of federal schools with equipment such as science and computer laboratories and libraries is lower than the state schools.

List Of Educational Institutions 

 EEFM PADRE LUIS FILGUEIRAS
 AVELINO FEITOSA EEF
 PADRE CRISTIANO COELHO EEF
 JOSE ALENCAR ALVES EEF 
 CRIANCA ESPERANCA EEI 
 JOSE LIBERALINO DA SILVA EEIEF
 ALVIN ALVES EEIEF 
 REUNIDAS SANTO EXPEDITO EEF 
 15 DE NOVEMBRO EEIEF 
 ADELIA MILFONT EEI 
 ANTONIO LAURENTINO ESC MUL 
 ESCOLA MUNICIPAL DE ENSINO FUNDAMENTAL PROFESSOR BELEM 
 CONCEICAO DE BRITO ESC MUL 
 ESCOLA MUNICIPAL FRANCISCO LEAO DE ARAUJO 
 ESCOLA MUNICIPAL JOAO LEAL 
 JOAO PAULO II ESC MUL 
 ESCOLA MUNICIPAL DE ENSINO FUNDAMENTAL JOAQUIM ANTONIO DE SANTANA 
 JORGE FURTADO ESC MUL 
 JOSE DE ALENCAR ESC MUL 
 ESCOLA MUNICIPAL DE ENSINO FUNDAMENTAL JOSE DE ALENCAR 
 ESCOLA MUNICIPAL OTON PATROCINIO 
 ESCOLA MUNICIPAL PEDRO ANTONIO 
 ESCOLA MUNICIPAL DOM QUINTINO 
 ESCOLA MUNICIPAL VISCONDE DE CAIRU 
 PROGRAMA DE ERRADICACAO DO TRABALHO INFANTIL - PETI 
 ESCOLA MUNICIPAL ANTONIA MARIA DA CONCEICAO
 ASSOCIACAO DOS EDUCADORES DE NOVA OLINDA - CENTRO DE EDUCACAO BASICA EEIEFM
 POLO DE ATENDIMENTO ANTONIO JEREMIAS PEREIRA
 UNIVERSO DO SABER EEIEF
 LAURENIO FEITOSA EEIEF
 ARCO IRIS EEIEF

References 

Municipalities in Ceará